Lycorma olivacea is a planthopper indigenous to Taiwan.

Taxonomy and discovery 
Lycorma olivacea is a species in the genus Lycorma, in the planthopper family Fulgoridae, subfamily Aphaeninae. Species within this genus are found in Asia. L. olivacea, along with L. meliae, was described by Masayo Kato in Taiwan in 1929 and the species has not been reclassified since. Taxonomic classification places three other species (L. delicatula, L. meliae, and L. imperialis) as closely related to L. olivacea.

See also 
 Lycorma
 Lycorma delicatula
 Lycorma imperialis
 Lycorma meliae

References 

Aphaeninae
Taxa named by Masayo Kato
Insects described in 1929